Synodus lobeli, Lobel's lizardfish, is a species of lizardfish that lives mainly in the Northwest Pacific Ocean.

Lobel's lizardfish is a marine species. They live within a demersal depth range of about 31 – 140 meters in the tropics. The average length of this species as an unsexed male is about 23.4 centimeters or about 9.2 inches. They are pale colored with dark splotches on its upper body. They are native to the areas of Northwest Pacific, Japan, Eastern Central Pacific, Hawaii, and Taiwan. They are commonly found on sandy bottoms and are recorded to be a benthic species.

Classification
The taxonomic classification of Synodus lobeli is as follows:
Kingdom-Animalia
Phylum-Chordata
Subphylum-Vertebrata
Superclass-Gnathostomata
Order-Aulopiformes
Family-Synodontidae
Genus-Synodus
Species-Synodus lobeli

References

Notes
 

Synodontidae
Fish of Hawaii
Fish described in  1988